The Quinnipiac Bobcats program represented Quinnipiac University during the 2015-16 NCAA Division I women's ice hockey season.

Offseason
 Shiann Darkangelo (Class of '15) was selected for Team USA in the 4 Nations Cup tournament.

Recruiting

2015–16 Bobcats

Schedule

|-
!colspan=12 style=""| Regular Season

|-
!colspan=12 style=""| ECAC Tournament

|-
!colspan=12 style=""| NCAA Tournament

Awards and honors
Taylar Cianfarano, ECAC Player of the Year

Taylar Cianfarano, ECAC Best Forward

Sydney Rossman, ECAC Best Goaltender

Kristen Tamberg, Mandi Schwartz Student-Athlete of the Year

Taylar Cianfarano, Forward, All-ECAC First Team

Sydney Rossman, Goaltender, All-ECAC First Team

Kristen Tamberg, Defense, All-ECAC Second Team

Nicole Kosta, Forward, All-ECAC Third Team

Emma Woods, Forward, All-ECAC Third Team

Melissa Samoskevich, Forward, All-ECAC Rookie Team

Sydney Rossman was second nationally in Goals Against Average (0.90)

References

Quinnipiac
Quinnipiac Bobcats women's ice hockey seasons
Quinnipiac